Toshiba Brave Lupus Tokyo is a Japanese rugby union team in the Japan Rugby League One. They are based in Fuchu, Tokyo, as is their local rival Suntory Sungoliath. They won the second ever Top League championship in the 2004-5 season and the Microsoft Cup in 2005 under their innovative and inventive coach Masahiro Kunda, himself a former hooker for Toshiba and Japan. They are particularly known for the strength of their mauls. Before the Top League was created, the team was called Toshiba Fuchu after their location. Their slogan for 2006 season was "Once again to the Pinnacle (Restart)". The team rebranded as Toshiba Brave Lupus Tokyo ahead of the rebranding of the Top League to Japan Rugby League One in 2022.

Honours

All-Japan Championship
 Champions: 1997, 1998, 1999, 2004, 2006 (joint champions with NEC Green Rockets), 2007
 Top League:
 Champions: 2004-05, 2005–06, 2006–07, 2008–09, 2009-10

Current squad

The Toshiba Brave Lupus Tokyo squad for the 2023 season is:

 * denotes players qualified to play for the Japan on dual nationality or residency grounds.

All Blacks Richie Mo’unga has signed with the Toshiba Brave Lupus Tokyo and is due to join the side after the 2023 Rugby World Cup.

Past players
François Steyn - fly-half and full back for Toshiba 
Shogo Mukai - full back for Toshiba and Japan, now head coach of Coca-Cola Red Sparks
Masahiro Kunda - hooker for Toshiba and Japan
Andrew McCormick - centre, former captain of the Japan national rugby union team, now coaching at Coca-Cola Red Sparks
Wataru Murata - scrum-half (before he went to France and then played for Yamaha Jubilo)
Shinji Ono - number 8
Yohei Suzuki - full back
Ruatangi Vatuvei - lock/centre (moved to Kintetsu Liners before 2007-8 season)
Kei Yasuda - lock
Mamoru Ito - scrum-half
Scott McLeod - centre
Toshiaki Hirose (2004-16, 166 games) Fly-half/Winger, Japanese international (2007-15, 28 caps)
Tomoki Yoshida (2004-17, 124 games) Scrum-half, Japanese international (2007-11, 25 caps)
Hiroki Yuhara (2006-20, 156 games) Hooker, Japanese international (2010-15, 22 caps)
Steven Bates (2008-16, 119 games) Loose forward, Allblack (2004, 1 cap)
Takehisa Usuzuki (2008-22, 118 games) Winger/Fullback, Japanese international (2011, 7 caps)
Takuma Asahara (2010-19, 131 games) Prop, Japanese international (2013-18, 12 caps)

References

External links
Toshiba Brave Lupus official site
NEC, Toshiba share title, Daily Yomiuri, February 27, 2006
Toshiba teaches Waseda a lesson, Daily Yomiuri, February 20, 2006
Toshiba downs Suntory, wins Microsoft, Daily Yomiuri, February 6, 2006
Brave Lupus add name to rugby Cup- Japan Times, February 7, 2005 
Toshiba, Yamaha set to do battle in Microsoft Cup final - Japan Times, January 31, 2005
Inventive approach from Toshiba's coach is rewarded with Top League crown Japan Times, December 30, 2004

Japan Rugby League One teams
Rugby in Kantō
Rugby clubs established in 1948
Sports teams in Tokyo
Toshiba
Fuchū, Tokyo
1948 establishments in Japan